Webster Clay Ball (October 6, 1848 – March 6, 1922) was a jeweler and watchmaker born in Fredericktown, Ohio who founded the Ball Watch Company.  When Standard Time was adopted in 1883, he was the first jeweler to use time signals from the United States Naval Observatory, bringing accurate time to Cleveland.

Early life
Born on a farm in Knox County, Ohio, Webb C. Ball was married in 1879 to Florence I. Young, of Kenton, Ohio.  They had one son, Sidney Y. Ball (born September 19, 1880), and three daughters, Wilma Ball, Florence Ball, and Alice Ball Andrews.  He was the son of Aaron Taylor Ball (born December 19, 1820 in Fredericktown, Ohio) and Sidney Ann Clay (born April 2, 1820 in Frederick, MD).  His grandparents were Zenas Ball (born November 15, 1792 in South Orange, NJ, died October 3, 1860) and Sarah Taylor (born May 24, 1796, died March 30, 1860).  He died at his home in Cleveland Heights, Ohio, survived by his wife & children.

Watchmaker history
After a two-year apprenticeship to a jeweler, Ball settled in Cleveland, Ohio to join a jewelry store.

In 1891 there was a collision between Lake Shore and Michigan Southern Railway trains at Kipton, Ohio, which occurred because an engineer's watch had stopped. The railroad officials commissioned Webb C. Ball as their Chief Time Inspector, in order to establish precision standards and a reliable timepiece inspection system for railroad chronometers.

He established strict guidelines for the manufacturing of sturdy, reliable precision timepieces, including resistance to magnetism, reliability of time keeping in 5 positions, isochronism, power reserve and dial arrangement, accompanied with record keeping of the reliability of the watch on each regular inspection. 

His original jewelry business in Cleveland grew into the Ball Watch Company (currently headquartered in La Chaux-de-Fonds, Switzerland), which used other watch companies' movements, perfecting them and then reselling them. Ball Watch Company also ordered watches complete from other watch companies. Ball used movements from the top American manufacturers, Elgin, Hamilton, and Waltham. The company switched to Swiss Avia movements as early as the 1940s. The Waltham Watch Company complied immediately with the requirements of Ball's guidelines, later followed by Elgin National Watch Company and most of the other American manufacturers: Aurora, Hamilton, Hampden, E. Howard & Co., Illinois, Seth Thomas, later on joined by some Swiss watch manufacturers: Audemars Piguet, Gallet, Longines, Record Watch, Vacheron Constantin.

Webb C. Ball became the vice president of the Hamilton Watch Company and focused his efforts on developing watches for the railroads. Minutes of Proceedings of Third Triennial Convention of the Brotherhood of Locomotive Engineers and Trainmen held in the B of LE Auditorium, Cleveland, Ohio on May 31, 1921 at 2 PM the convention was called to order by Grand Chief Engineer W.S. Stone, at this afternoon session Webb C. Ball was introduced, he made a speech, and a resolution was passed unanimously, and he was made an Honorary Member of the Brotherhood.

They were the first wrist watch allowed to be used on the Railroads, (using a Swiss manual-winding movement) followed quickly by the first American made wrist watch on "the roads", Elgin.

The firm was family owned by direct descendants until the 1990s when the right to use the name was sold. The new firm continues the tradition, using Swiss-made (primarily ETA) movements and making watches for sportsmen and even for some small railroads.

The Horological Institute of America celebrated his efforts on October 20, 1921.

See also
Owney (dog)
Railway signalling

References

External links
 Official website
 History of Ball Watch Company and Online Museum
 North American Distributor
 Elgin Serial Numbers
 Waltham Serial Numbers

American people in rail transportation
1847 births
American watchmakers (people)
American jewellers
1922 deaths
People from Fredericktown, Ohio
People from Cleveland Heights, Ohio